Nepenthes × truncalata (a blend of truncata and alata) is a natural hybrid involving N. alata and N. truncata. Like its two parent species, it is endemic to the Philippines, but limited in distribution by the natural range of N. truncata on Mindanao.

References

 Mann, P. 1998. A trip to the Philippines. Carnivorous Plant Newsletter 27(1): 6–11.
 McPherson, S.R. & V.B. Amoroso 2011. Field Guide to the Pitcher Plants of the Philippines. Redfern Natural History Productions, Poole.
 CP Database: Nepenthes × truncalata

Carnivorous plants of Asia
truncalata
Nomina nuda
Flora of Mindanao